The Louisiana–Monroe vs. Northwestern State football rivalry is a former American college football rivalry between the Louisiana–Monroe Warhawks and the Northwestern State Demons. The rivalry stems from the time the two teams spent competing together in the Gulf States Conference (1953–71) and later in the Southland Conference (1987–93). The game has been infrequently played since 1994, following Louisiana–Monroe's move to the NCAA's Football Bowl Subdivision.

History
The two teams have met 48 times on the football field, with Northwestern State currently holding a 28–19–1 edge in the all-time series. In the 1992 game, the teams' mascots Vic the Demon and Chief Brave Spirit got involved in a fight that distracted television cameras to the point that the entire altercation was caught on video. In the scuffle, Vic the Demon's head is ripped off as the two crashed to the ground behind one of the end zones, which according to the video clip breaks a "cardinal rule" of being a mascot. The melee was broken up by college police without further incident.

Game results

See also 
 List of NCAA college football rivalry games

References

College football rivalries in the United States
Louisiana–Monroe Warhawks football
Northwestern State Demons football
1952 establishments in Louisiana